The divine spark is a term used in various different religious traditions.

Gnosticism

In Gnosticism, the divine spark is the portion of God that resides within each human being.

The purpose of life is to enable the Divine Spark to be released from its captivity in matter and reestablish its connection with, or simply return to, God, who is perceived as being the source of the Divine Light. In the Gnostic Christian tradition, Christ is seen as a wholly divine being which has taken human form in order to lead humanity back to the Light.

The Cathars of medieval Europe also shared the belief in the divine spark. They saw this idea expressed most powerfully in the opening words of the Gospel of St John.

Quakers
Quakers, known formally as the Religious Society of Friends, are generally united by a belief in each human's ability to experience the light within or see "that of God in every one". Most Quakers believe in continuing revelation: that God continuously reveals truth directly to individuals. George Fox said, "Christ has come to teach His people Himself." Friends often focus on feeling the presence of God. As Isaac Penington wrote in 1670, "It is not enough to hear of Christ, or read of Christ, but this is the thing – to feel him to be my root, my life, and my foundation..." Quakers reject the idea of priests, believing in the priesthood of all believers. Some express their concept of God using phrases such as "the inner light", "inward light of Christ", or "Holy Spirit". Quakers first gathered around George Fox in the mid–17th century and belong to a historically Protestant Christian set of denominations.

See also

References

Gnosticism
Catharism
Religious philosophical concepts